Saphenista bimaculata is a species of moth of the family Tortricidae. It is found in Costa Rica.

The length of the forewings is 7-7.3 mm. The forewings are yellowish orange, intermixed with pale yellowish-orange scales. The hindwings are pale yellowish orange with several pale-brown irregular bands along the costa to the apex.

The larvae feed on Ageratina ixiocladon. They induce galls near the apex of the stem of their host plant, near the nodes. The galls are globose or slightly elongate and about 6 mm wide and 7–18 mm long. Most of the frass is ejected outside of the gall chamber. Pupation takes place within or outside the gall chamber.

Etymology
The species name refers to the two large spots on the costa of the forewing and is derived from Latin maculata (meaning spot).

References

Moths described in 2004
Saphenista